Karl Löb (1910–1983) was an Austrian-born cinematographer. He worked on over ninety films in Austria and Germany including the 1953 comedy Miss Casanova. Löb was born to an ethnically German family in the Czech part of the Austro-Hungarian Empire, but emigrated to Berlin following the Empire's dissolution.

Selected filmography
 The Spanish Fly (1931)
 Signal in the Night (1937)
 After Midnight (1938)
 The Leghorn Hat (1939)
 Torreani (1951)
 The Prince of Pappenheim (1952)
 The Rose of Stamboul (1953)
 The Cousin from Nowhere (1953)
 Clivia (1954)
 The Great Lola (1954)
 The Faithful Hussar (1954)
 Consul Strotthoff (1954)
 The Country Schoolmaster (1954)
 Ball at the Savoy (1955)
 Love, Dance and a Thousand Songs (1955)
 Music in the Blood (1955)
 Before God and Man (1955)
 The First Day of Spring (1956)
 The Beautiful Master (1956)
 Just Once a Great Lady (1957)
 Precocious Youth (1957)
 Munchhausen in Africa (1958)
 The Star of Santa Clara (1958)
 And That on Monday Morning (1959)
 What a Woman Dreams of in Springtime (1959)
 The Thousand Eyes of Dr. Mabuse (1960)
 Yes, Women are Dangerous (1960)
 The Dead Eyes of London (1961)
 The Return of Doctor Mabuse (1961)
 Our House in Cameroon (1961)
 The Inn on the River (1962)
 The Door with Seven Locks (1962)
 The Thousand Eyes of Dr. Mabuse (1962)
 The Indian Scarf (1963)
 Our Crazy Nieces (1963)
 The Last Ride to Santa Cruz (1964)
 Our Crazy Aunts in the South Seas (1964)
 Der Hexer (1964)
 Long Legs, Long Fingers (1966)
 Winnetou and Old Firehand (1966)
 The Hunchback of Soho (1966)
 The Monk with the Whip (1967)
 The Gorilla of Soho (1968)
 The Hound of Blackwood Castle (1968)
 The Man with the Glass Eye (1969)
 How Did a Nice Girl Like You Get Into This Business? (1970)
 What Is the Matter with Willi? (1970)
 Under the Roofs of St. Pauli (1970)
 Our Willi Is the Best (1971)
 The Body in the Thames (1971)
 Willi Manages The Whole Thing (1972)
 The Heath Is Green (1972)

References

Bibliography
 Fritsche, Maria. Homemade Men In Postwar Austrian Cinema: Nationhood, Genre and Masculinity . Berghahn Books, 2013.

External links

1910 births
1983 deaths
German cinematographers
People from Teplice